Oneida is an American experimental rock band from Brooklyn, New York, United States. Their influences include psychedelic rock, krautrock, electronic, noise rock, and minimalism, but the overall structure and intent of their music is not taken directly from any of these styles. Common elements found in their music include improvisation, repetition, driving rhythms, antique and analog equipment, and an overall eclecticism.

Timeline

In 2001, Oneida performed at the El Macombo in Toronto with the Constantines and Grand Total.

In 2002, the band released an LP, Each One Teach One, which  begins with two especially long tracks, Sheets of Easter and Antibiotics, the former over fourteen minutes long, the latter more than sixteen. Both of these songs consist of one repeated riff (with a few short interludes on Antibiotics), which typifies the band's frequent use of repetition. Oneida's music can also be distinguished by the band's use of antique keyboards and analog electric pianos.

The band also operates Brah Records, an imprint of Jagjaguwar. The label has released records by Dirty Faces, Parts & Labor, Oakley Hall, Home, Company, and an Oneida/Plastic Crimewave Sound split 12".

In September 2007, the group celebrated 10 years of existence with a concert at the P.S. 1 Contemporary Art Center in New York City.

In June 2008, it was announced that the band would be releasing a triptych of new records, referred to as the "Thank Your Parents" series. The first of these was Preteen Weaponry, which was released in August 2008, and the second was a triple album, Rated O, released in July 2009.  The final release, the experimental Absolute II, followed in 2011.

The band were chosen to perform their third extended 'Ocropolis' set at the ATP I'll Be Your Mirror festival curated by ATP & Portishead in September 2011 in Asbury Park, New Jersey.

In 2011, the band lost its dedicated studio "The Ocropolis" when the Monster Island Complex was demolished. A List of Burning Mountains, released in 2012, is "the last transmission from the Ocropolis."  The band retreated from the studio for a number of years in favor of the stage, and putting-out a variety of ultra-limited, uncompromising releases that documented the band’s continuously unfolding journey over the next few years. In 2016, they released their album-length collaboration with Rhys Chatham, What's Your Sign? By this time, they had started rehearsing and recording at Secret Project Robot (also in Brooklyn) and in 2017 signed with Joyful Noise Recordings to promote and release their next album Romance.

Members

Kid Millions (John Colpitts) – drums, vocals (formerly of Adhesive X and Pocket Monster)
Bobby Matador – organ, guitar, vocals
Hanoi Jane – guitar, bass
Showtime (Shahin Motia) (of Ex Models) – guitar
Barry London – synths, organ, effects

Previous members
PCRZ (aka Papa Crazee or Pat Sullivan), now with Oakley Hall – keyboards, guitar
Double Rainbow (aka Phil Manley of Trans Am and The Fucking Champs) – guitar

Discography

Studio albums
 A Place Called El Shaddai's (Turnbuckle, 1997)
 Enemy Hogs (Turnbuckle, 1999: re-issued by Jagjaguwar, 2001)
 Come on Everybody Let's Rock (Jagjaguwar, 2000)
 Anthem of the Moon (Jagjaguwar, 2001)
 Each One Teach One (Jagjaguwar, 2002)
 Secret Wars (Jagjaguwar, 2004)
 The Wedding (Jagjaguwar, 2005)
 Happy New Year (Jagjaguwar, 2006)
 Preteen Weaponry (Jagjaguwar, 2008)
 Rated O (Jagjaguwar, 2009)
 Absolute II (Jagjaguwar, 2011)
 A List of the Burning Mountains (Jagjaguwar, 2012)
 The Brah Tapes (Brah, 2015)
 What's Your Sign? with Rhys Chatham (Northern Spy Records, 2016)
 Romance (Joyful Noise Recordings, 2018)
 Success (Joyful Noise Recordings, 2022)

Compilations
 Seeds of Contemplation (Jagjaguwar, 2007)

EPs
 Steel Rod (Jagjaguwar, 2000)
 Atheists, Reconsider (Arena Rock Recording Co., 2002) /split with Liars
 Nice. / Splittin' Peaches (Ace Fu, 2004)

Singles
 "Best Friends" / "The Land of Bugs" (Turnbuckle, 1998)
 "Bobby's Black Thumb" (Jagjaguwar, 2002) /split with Songs: Ohia
 "Anthem of the Moon" (Jagjaguwar, 2002) / split with Brother JT
 "Caesar's Column" (Rough Trade, 2004)
 "Split" (Brah, 2005) / split with Plastic Crimewave Sound
 "Heads Ain't Ready" (These Are Not Records, 2008)
 "Green Corridor" (Altin Village & Mine, 2010) / split with Pterodactyl
 "Equinox" / "Last Hit" (Xhol Recordings, 2010)
 "Human Factor" (Limited Appeal, 2010)
 "Split" (Rocket Recordings, 2011) / split with Mugstar
 "Town Crier" (Joyful Noise Recordings, 2017)
 "Cockfights" (Joyful Noise Recordings, 2018) / split with Yonatan Gat

Live albums
 Street People (Bulb, 2001) /Split with 25 Suaves
 Fine European Food and Wine (Scotch Tapes, 2010)
 Live at Secret Project Robot (Safety Meeting, 2017) /Featuring James McNew of Yo La Tengo and Lee Ranaldo

References

External links
Band website

Musical groups from Brooklyn
Musical groups established in 1997
Rough Trade Records artists
Arena Rock Recording Company artists
Joyful Noise Recordings artists
Jagjaguwar artists
Northern Spy Records artists